"Dame" (English: "Give Me") is a song written by Carlos Lara and recorded by RBD for their third Spanish studio album Celestial (2006). The song was sent to radio stations in the United States to see what the results would become. The song debuted in February 2007 at number 42 on the Billboard Hot Latin Songs in the US and has peaked at number 38 ever since.

During the Celestial World Tour, Uckermann and Herrera sang a few rap verses after the second chorus. In The Live Nation Show this rap was done just by Christopher.

Charts

References

2007 singles
RBD songs
Spanish-language songs
Pop ballads
2000s ballads
2006 songs
EMI Records singles
Virgin Records singles
Songs written by Carlos Lara (songwriter)
Articles containing video clips